Pekka Salminen (born 3 June 1981) is a Finnish former ski jumper who competed from 1998 to 2007. His best individual World Cup finish was eighth on the normal hill in Lahti on 3 March 1999, and his best team finish was third in Sapporo on 27 January 2002.

References

1981 births
Living people
Finnish male ski jumpers
People from Joroinen
Sportspeople from South Savo
20th-century Finnish people
21st-century Finnish people